Suravaram Pratapa Reddy (1896—1953) was a social historian from the Hyderabad State (now Telangana), India.

Life

Pratapa Reddy was born on 28 May 1896 in Boravelli village in Gadwal district of erstwhile Hyderabad State.

Bibliography
 Golconda Kavula Charitra
 Raamayana Visheeshaalu
 Hinduvula Pandagalu
 Hindava Dharma Viirulu
 Dathu Srinivas Patel
 Manchireddy Chenna Reddy
 Andhrula Sanghika Charithra
and many short stories and poems.

References

Sources

1896 births
1953 deaths
Writers from Hyderabad, India
Telugu poets
Recipients of the Sahitya Akademi Award in Telugu
People from Mahbubnagar district
20th-century Indian poets
Indian male poets
20th-century Indian male writers
People from Wanaparthy district
Poets from Telangana